Galgun-e Bala (also Romanized as Galgūn-e Bālā) is a village in Khusf Rural District, Central District, Khusf County, South Khorasan Province, Iran. At the 2006 census, its population was 83, in 21 families.

References 

Populated places in Khusf County